Sundem was a feudal state that existed in the Indian state of Goa. The kings were called 'Sonda Raja' or 'Soundekar Raja'. They were feudatory vassals at various times to the Vijayanagara Empire, Maratha Empire and the Bijapur Sultanate. Finally they became vassals of the Portuguese Empire. They were called the 'Rei de Sundem' in Portuguese.

List of Rajas 
Sawai Basavalinga I Rajendra Udaiyar 1763 - 1843 
Sadashiva II Rajendra Udaiyar 1843 
Vira Rajendra Udaiyar 1843 - 1893
Sawai Basavalinga II Rajendra Udaiyar ? 
Sawai Vira Sadashiva Rajendra Udaiyar ?
Basavalinga II Rajendra Udaiyar ? - 1935

References 

History of Goa
Former countries in South Asia